Gastunk (stylized as GASTUNK) is an influential Japanese rock band, first active from 1983 to 1988. Initially a hardcore punk band, guitarist Tatsu later recalled that when Gastunk made their major label debut they were dubbed heavy metal by the media. They reunited for one-off concerts in 1999 and 2006, before fully restarting activities in 2010.

History
Formed in 1983 by bassist Baby, Gastunk went through several lineup changes in their early years. In 1984, they contributed three songs to the Holdup Omnibus compilation. A self-titled EP was released in February 1985, followed by their first album, Dead Song, in August. That month saw Gastunk appear on the NHK TV show Indies no Shūrai, and perform at an event sponsored by Takarajimasha. In 1986, the band released the single "Geronimo" and two EPs, The Vanishing Signs and To Fans. They also performed at the Indies Festival 1986 at Hibiya Open-Air Concert Hall that September. The album Under the Sun, featuring a cover created by Tadanori Yokoo, was released in June 1987. A different mix of the album, with a new cover by Pushead, was released internationally in November. Gastunk recorded their third album, June 1988's Mother, in Los Angeles. At the Street Fighting Man event at MZA Ariake In November 1988, the band suddenly announced that they would be disbanding. The reason being that Baby wanted to pursue a musical career in America. Gastunk held their farewell concert at Shibuya Public Hall on December 22, 1988.

Gastunk reunited in January 1999 for a concert at Akasaka Blitz called Rest in Peace in memory of hide, who died the previous year. It was recorded and released as a live album in November of that year, and later as a DVD in 2005.

Gastunk performed again in 2006 at an event commemorating the 30th anniversary of Shinjuku Loft, before officially restarting activities in January 2010. They released the three-track single "Deadman's Face" on June 9 as their first new material in 22 years. Drummer Pazz, who joined Gastunk in 1986, left the band in September 2019. He was replaced by Tatsu's The Deadrocks bandmate Kei in August 2020. Gastunk released Vintage Spirit, The Fact, their first album in 33 years, on June 9, 2021. On August 31, 2022, the band announced that vocalist Baki, who first joined in 1984, had suddenly decided to leave Gastunk. The remaining three members cancelled four scheduled shows as a result, but stated that they will continue activities.

Influence
Gastunk have been labeled the originators of mixing metal and punk music. They have also been noted for their visual aesthetics coinciding with visual kei, with Baki wearing white face paint inspired by Kiss and Tatsu having red hair.

Musicians such as Hide, Hyde, and Hakuei of Penicillin have cited Gastunk as an influence or expressed admiration for them. Morrie cited how Baki alternated between distorted and clean vocals from one song to the next as influencing him in establishing his own vocal style. Early in his career, Aki of Laputa imitated Gastunk's use of difficult or uncommon kanji in lyrics.

Members
 Baby – bass 1983–1988, 1999, 2006, 2010–present (ex:The Execute, →The Highest Region, Rebel Tribe)
  – guitar 1983–1988, 1999, 2006, 2010–present (ex:Dead Cops, →Jacks 'n' Joker, The Eye Scream, The Killing Red Addiction, Punktronica, The Deadrocks)
 Kei – drums 2020–present (ex:The Jacks, →The Deadrocks)

Former members
 Naoki – guitar 1983 (ex:The Comes, →Lip Cream) Died 2021
 Yutaka – vocals 1983–1984 (ex:Dead Cops as "Otakevi")
 Matsumura – drums 1983–1986 (ex:The Comes)
 Kill – drums 1984
 Shigeru "Pazz" Kobayashi – drums 1986–1988, 1999, 2006, 2010–2019 (ex:Z.O.A.,→Doom, Quartergate, I love you... OK?)
  – vocals 1984–1988, 1999, 2006, 2010–2022 (ex:Lip Cream, The Execute, Joy, →Quartergate, No. 9, Mosquito Spiral)

Discography

Studio albums
 Dead Song (August 1985)
 Under the Sun (June 21, 1987; US version, December 1987)
 Mother (June 21, 1988)
 Vintage Spirit, The Fact (June 9, 2021), Oricon Albums Chart Peak Position: No. 24

EPs
 Gastunk (February 1985)
 The Vanishing Signs (May 1, 1986)
 To Fans (July 1986)
 Midnight Rain (November 18, 1988), No. 82

Singles
 "Mr. Gazime" (December 1985)
 "Geronimo" (March 30, 1986)
 "Sunshine of Your Love" (December 16, 1988) Oricon Singles Chart Peak Position: No. 85
 "Counter-Clock Wise" (June 1988)
 "Dead Song" (1989, in Rockin' f magazine)
 "Deadman's Face" (June 9, 2010) No. 128

Live albums
 The End (February 21, 1989) No. 82
 Rest in Peace (March 25, 1999)
 Live at Loft 2011 (limited cassette, 2018)

Compilation albums
 Heartful Melody (1983-1988) (1994)
 Early Singles (August 21, 2002)

Home videos
 Smash the Wall (VHS:1988, DVD:February 20, 2004)
 Revelation (VHS:1988, DVD:November 15, 2006)
 The End Vol. 1
 The End Vol. 2
 The End Vol. 1 & 2 (March 25, 2004)
 Rest in Peace (February 23, 2005)
 Gig DVD 1987 (November 8, 2006)
 Double Gigs (August 6, 2008)
 Gig DVD 1988 (April 21, 2010)
 Arise Again Tour 2010 (November 17, 2010)
 The Running Mad Blood in a Dead Indian's Dream! (2 DVDs & 1 CD, February 6, 2019) Oricon DVDs Chart Peak Position: No. 54

References

External links
 Official site
 Official MySpace
 Tatsu official site

Japanese hard rock musical groups
Japanese heavy metal musical groups
Japanese hardcore punk groups
Musical groups from Tokyo
Musical groups established in 1983
Musical groups disestablished in 1988
Musical groups reestablished in 1999
Musical groups reestablished in 2006
Musical groups reestablished in 2010
Musical quartets